The 1991 Badminton World Cup was the thirteenth edition of an international tournament Badminton World Cup. The event was held in Portuguese Macau from 7 August to 10 August 1991. Indonesia won the men's singles and mixed doubles events while China won the women's singles. Malaysia secured a title in men's doubles discipline & South Korea clinched the women's doubles title.

Medalists

Men's singles

Finals

Women's singles

Finals

Men's doubles

Finals

Women's doubles

Finals

Mixed doubles

Finals

References 
 https://web.archive.org/web/20061214225036/http://tangkis.tripod.com/world/1991.htm
 
 

Badminton World Cup
1991 in badminton
International sports competitions hosted by Macau
Badminton in Macau